Le Déluge is an early fictional work about trouble and fear in major Western cities by Nobel laureate J. M. G. Le Clézio.

Contents

Publication history

First French Edition

Second French Edition

First English Edition

Second English Edition

References

1966 French novels
Novels by J. M. G. Le Clézio
Works by J. M. G. Le Clézio
Éditions Gallimard books